Clark Knoll is an ice-covered knoll  southwest of Mount Dane in the western part of Radford Island, Marshall Archipelago. It was mapped by the United States Antarctic Service (1939–41) and by the United States Geological Survey from surveys and from U.S. Navy air photos (1959–65). It was named by the Advisory Committee on Antarctic Names for Elton G. Clark, utilitiesman, U.S. Navy, at Byrd Station in 1967.

References 

Hills of Marie Byrd Land